The 1975–76 Georgetown Hoyas men's basketball team represented Georgetown University during the 1975–76  NCAA Division I college basketball season. John Thompson, coached them in his fourth season as head coach. An independent, Georgetown played its home games at McDonough Gymnasium on the Georgetown campus in Washington, D.C., and finished the season with a record of 21-7. The team won the 1976 ECAC South Region tournament and appeared in the 1976 NCAA tournament for the second consecutive year, losing in the first round to Arizona.

Season recap

Sophomore center Ed Hopkins had required surgery for a serious leg injury during the summer of 1975, and his recovery hampered him this season, although he appeared in 26 of Georgetowns 28 games. With Hopkins limited, and despite suffering from back problems, senior center and team co-captain Merlin Wilson started all 28 games, shot 57 percent from the field, and averaged 11.1 points and 9.8 rebounds per game. He had a 22-point, 20-rebound performance against Upsala in the season opener, the last of eight 20-rebound games during his collegiate career, by far a school record no one has come close to since.

Although he averaged only 13 shots per game, sophomore guard Derrick Jackson became the team's leading scorer this season, the first of three seasons he achieved this. He averaged 17 points per game and scored a career-high 28 points against Penn State. Over the season as a whole, he shot 195-for-399 (48.9%) from the field and scored 406 points; he would post almost identical statistics the following season.

Freshman forward Al Dutch started all 28 games and had a strong season, scoring 20 or more points in six games. He scored 27 points in Georgetowns overtime upset of No. 12-ranked St. John's and 28 points against Navy. Freshman guard Steve Martin gave a glimpse of his future potential when he shot 6-for-6 from the field and scored 14 points in a game against Southern Connecticut State. Senior forward Bill Lynn, meanwhile, scored 22 points against Southern Connecticut State and shot 53 percent from the field for the season, specializing in outside jump shots. Junior forward Larry Long missed the first 11 games of the season because of academic issues, but returned to the team to shoot 42% from the field and average 7.4 points per game for the year.

Although retaining its status as an independent, Georgetown was in its second season as a member of the Eastern College Athletic Conference (ECAC), a loosely organized sports federation that held four regional post-season Division I basketball tournaments in 1976 for independent Eastern colleges and universities similar to the end-of-season conference tournaments held by conventional college basketball conferences, with each tournament winner receiving an at-large bid to the 1976 NCAA Division I men's basketball tournament. For the second straight year, the Hoyas competed in the ECAC South Region tournament, which they had won the previous year. Derrick Jackson scored 22 points as Georgetown defeated Villanova in the semifinal.

In the final on March 6, 1976, the Hoyas faced George Washington, which was on the brink of reaching the NCAA Tournament for the first time since 1961. George Washington had defeated Georgetown in eight of the last 11 meetings between the schools, including a regular-season game only nine days earlier. Georgetown's starters scored only 21 points, but the Hoyas' bench scored 44 and the Hoyas won 68–63 to take the ECAC South Region championship for the second consecutive season and secure a second-straight NCAA Tournament bid. The Colonials did not come as close to an NCAA Tournament appearance again until they received a bid to the 1993 tournament. Georgetown senior guard and team co-captain Jonathan Smith, a former team scoring leader whose numbers had declined this season and who had averaged only 5.6 points per game during the regular season, scored 20 points against Villanova and 16 against George Washington during the ECAC South Region Tournament.

Playing in the NCAA Tournament's West Region, Georgetown lost in the first round to 15th-ranked Arizona. Derrick Jackson again scored 22 points during the game, while Jonathan Smith scored 20.

The team was not ranked in the Top 20 in the Associated Press Poll or Coaches' Poll at any time.

Roster
Source

Sophomore guard Craig Esherick would later serve as an assistant coach for the Hoyas from 1982 to 1999 and as head coach from 1999 to 2004. Sophomore guard Mike Riley would later serve as a Hoya assistant coach from 1982 to 2004.

1975–76 schedule and results

Sources
 All times are Eastern

|-
!colspan=9 style="background:#002147; color:#8D817B;"| Regular season

|-
!colspan=9 style="background:#002147; color:#8D817B;"| ECAC South Region tournament

|-
!colspan=9 style="background:#002147; color:#8D817B;"| NCAA tournament

References

Georgetown Hoyas men's basketball seasons
Georgetown
Georgetown
Georgetown Hoyas men's basketball team
Georgetown Hoyas men's basketball team